Wyze Labs, Inc. (formerly Wyzecam), also known as Wyze, is a U.S. company based in Seattle, Washington, that specializes in smart home products and wireless cameras. Wyze Labs is a small start-up, formed by former Amazon employees.

History 
Wyze was incorporated on July 19, 2017, by the four co-founders: CEO Yun Zhang, CPO Dongsheng Song, CMO Dave Crosby, and Elana Fishman. Wyze released their first product, the WyzeCam v1, on October 24, 2017. Shortly after, the Wyze Cam V2 was announced on February 18th, and(due to a hardware defect) started shipping in early April of the same year. On October 24, 2018, Wyze had sold 1 million units of the Wyze Cam.   On January 31, 2019, Wyze announced a $20 million investment from Norwest Venture Partners. On March 2020, when the COVID-19 pandemic hit the world, Wyze was on the verge of shutting down. But the company managed to survive the pandemic by reducing the amount of money it originally wanted to raise from 50 million to 10 million, and by adding the Cam Plus subscription plan, among other things.  At the end of 2022, Wyze announced 2023 as the “year of the camera”, and released three new cameras as of March 2nd, 2023

Disputes and security concerns
In 2019 Sensormatic, a wholly-owned subsidiary of Johnson Controls, sued Wyze, alleging seven patent violations.  Wyze prevailed in the lawsuit, as of September 2020.

In December 2019, the company acknowledged that a server leak had exposed the details of roughly 2.4 million customers. The company's response included logging all users out of their accounts, requiring all users to reauthenticate.

In 2021, Xiaomi submitted a report to Amazon alleging that Wyze had infringed upon its 2019 "Autonomous Cleaning Device and Wind Path Structure of Same" robot vacuum patent. On July 15, 2021, Wyze filed a lawsuit against Xiaomi in the U.S. District Court for the Western District of Washington, arguing that prior art exists and asking the court for a declaratory judgment that Xiaomi's 2019 robot vacuum patent is invalid.

In 2022, security firm Bitdefender announced that Wyze had discontinued WyzeCam v1 because of a security vulnerability that Bitdefender had reported to Wyze three years before, which is an unusually long time for a vulnerability to go unreported to the public. Wyze did not make any public announcement about the vulnerability.

References

External links 
 https://wyze.com/

Smart home hubs
Companies based in Seattle
2017 establishments in Washington (state)
Video surveillance companies
Home automation companies
Heating, ventilation, and air conditioning companies
Headphones manufacturers
Lighting brands
Internet of things companies
IOS software
Android (operating system) software